Sarah Frew Davidson (July 20, 1804 – March 2, 1889) was a prominent educator in nineteenth-century Charlotte, North Carolina, United States. Her teaching of music was much praised. She kept a journal about life on the plantation where she lived.

Biography 

Sarah was born to William Davidson, North Carolina state senator and United States congressman, and Sarah Davidson in 1804. Her siblings were Margaret A. Davidson, Harriet Elizabeth Davidson, and William Archibald Frew Davidson.
Davidson was active as a music teacher in the Charlotte Mecklenburg area during her later years. According to a local history, Davidson "taught music for a number of years, and gave such satisfaction that she held a high place as a teacher of music in the opinions of eminent people."

Personal journal 

Davidson's 1837 journal is held by the Atkins Library at the University of North Carolina at Charlotte. A transcribed and annotated version of the journal has been compiled by volunteers at the Historic Rosedale Plantation and was published in 2005. The journal includes information about the rural plantation on which Sarah lived, the slaves her father owned, the small village of Charlotte, and the religious climate of the 1830s in North Carolina, among other topics.

References 

1804 births
1889 deaths
People from Charlotte, North Carolina
Educators from North Carolina
19th-century American women educators
19th-century American educators